KidsClick is a former daily children's programming block distributed by Sinclair Broadcast Group, which premiered on July 1, 2017. The block, which primarily consisted of long-form animated series as well as some short-form content, was carried in the U.S. on terrestrial television network TBD, and on Sinclair-owned/operated television stations in several markets. At launch, the block was available in 75 million households. The block marked the return of traditional weekday cartoons and Saturday morning cartoons to terrestrial television, as well as the first children's programming block on U.S. free-to-air television not to comply with Children's Television Act regulations since the Saban Brands-produced Vortexx was discontinued on September 27, 2014.

The This TV iteration of the block accompanied an existing, unbranded lineup of educational programming on weekend mornings, which had aired on the network since November 1, 2013, after the discontinuation of Cookie Jar Toons (which coincided with original co-owner Weigel Broadcasting transferring its 50% interest in the network to Tribune Broadcasting, as well as the Cookie Jar Group's absorption into DHX Media [now WildBrain]); it also marked the first time that This TV had carried children's programming on Monday through Saturday mornings since Tribune (whom Sinclair later attempted and failed to acquire) assumed partial ownership of the network. On July 1, 2018, This TV discontinued carriage of KidsClick, which was transferred to Sinclair's TBD channel, which had been carrying the block on a transitional basis since May 7 of that year.

On March 29, 2019, shortly after closing sister site Circa News, KidsClick's Facebook page announced the block's discontinuation on March 31, 2019.

History
On May 2, 2017, Sinclair Broadcast Group announced that it would launch a multiplatform children's programming block on linear television and online platforms. The company partnered with MGM Domestic Television Distribution to develop and distribute KidsClick, a joint venture between Sinclair Broadcast Group and Toon Goggles, which it planned to air nationally on This TV and select network affiliates (particularly those aligned with The CW, and the MyNetworkTV programming service, as well as some Fox-affiliated stations that do not carry local morning newscasts in the block's designated timeslots) and independent stations owned and/or operated by Sinclair on July 1, 2017. Its content encompasses short- and long-form material and is distributed online, through internet browsers and mobile apps in video-on-demand and live streaming formats. The network's distribution and website utilized Imagine Communications' cloud technology from Sinclair's Las Vegas studios for their market triopoly.

Sinclair returned to the children's television market with KidsClick several years after the demise of The Program Exchange (a barter syndicator of programming which ended up as the last company providing non-educational children's content to television stations before its 2016 dissolution), an industry estimated to be worth $1 billion, which is currently largely split in advertising revenue between Nickelodeon and Cartoon Network. Speaking to the return of children's programming on American commercial broadcast television, Steven M. Marks, COO and EVP of Sinclair Television Group, said in an earnings report on May 3, 2017: "That's a $1 billion-plus spot business that we don't get a dime from. So again, it's an illustration of going back into the marketplace and fishing in ponds that we haven't fished in. So that's $1 billion that is pretty much split between [two] cable networks: Nickelodeon and the Cartoon Network. Disney is a subscription network. 18 years ago, we were the kings of reaching kids every day. There's no reason in the world why we can't be successful in that space."

On Friday, March 29, 2019, KidsClick announced on Facebook that the block would air for the last time on March 31. Sinclair also discontinued sister property Circa News three days prior to the announcement. Sinclair would later claim that the block was discontinued "for business reasons", but that its use of cloud technology was a successful testing ground to use the technology for its digital broadcast networks.

KidsClick ended quietly on March 31, 2019, with an airing of Oggy and The Cockroaches; all advertising made no mention of its demise, and the promotional spot at the end of the show mentioned it would return Saturday morning. For the vast majority of stations carrying it, temporary or permanent paid programming, religious programming, other syndicated content, or alternate E/I-complaint shows overlaid the former timeslot until more permanent programming was scheduled in the fall; this would turn out to be the national news service from Sinclair, The National Desk, for many Sinclair stations. Paid programming and some Internet-originated content series replaced it on TBD. Several days later, the block's website was taken down, with the domain redirected to the main Sinclair corporate page.

A final postscript to the service came down three years later, when nineteen stations, along with Sinclair itself and Nexstar Media Group, were proposed to be fined $3.4 million for a violation of children's ad guidelines, involving advertising for Mattel's Hot Wheels airing during episodes of Team Hot Wheels without being screened out, which under said guidelines, made the entire half-hour a program-length commercial.

Scheduling
The block was preferred to air every Monday-Friday from 6:00 to 9:00 a.m., and Saturday and Sundays from 7:00 to 10:00 a.m. local time, though scheduling variances existed in certain markets due to network programming obligations (such as One Magnificent Morning airing from 8:00 to 11:00 a.m., which delayed or preempted the KidsClick Saturday Morning lineup on CW-affiliated stations that carried both blocks), existing contracts for other syndicated programming or with paid or religious programming providers, or a preference to air news and sports programming in those slots. It aired in a downscaled letterbox format via This TV, as that network had yet to upgrade to an HD master feed; it otherwise aired in HD or at least in widescreen on most of its affiliates and via the TBD network later on.

Because the programs featured on KidsClick did not meet educational content guidelines defined in the Children's Television Act by the Federal Communications Commission (FCC), This TV continued to air a block of live-action travel and wildlife series from Steve Rotfeld Productions immediately after the weekend broadcasts of the KidsClick lineup to fulfill the mandate (accordingly, the network's E/I block switched from a singular, three-hour block aired only on Sunday mornings to two separate 90-minute-long blocks that will air on Saturdays and Sundays). Sinclair-operated independent stations that aired KidsClick also continue to provide E/I-compliant programs acquired from the syndication market through individual distributors, from Fox's Xploration Station block managed by Rotfeld, or via the Litton Entertainment-distributed Go Time block to meet the quotas.

Programming

Former programming

Special programming

Delayed programming

Affiliate list

The following is a list of stations that carried KidsClick in syndication as of its March 31, 2019, discontinuation, which included the possibility that a TBD affiliate on a station owned by Sinclair or another owner would air the programming block in the same market near or at the same time:

References

 
Television programming blocks in the United States
This TV
Television channels and stations established in 2017
Television channels and stations disestablished in 2019
2017 American television series debuts
2019 American television series endings
Sinclair Broadcast Group